Vimioso is a municipality in the district of Bragança in the northern part of Portugal. The population in 2011 was 4,669, in an area of 481.59 km². It is recognised as having a significant number of Mirandese speakers.

In 1516, Vimioso was elevated to the administrative status of a village by order of King Manual I.

Geography

Climate

Parishes
The municipality is composed of 10 parishes:
 Algoso, Campo de Víboras e Uva
 Caçarelhos e Angueira
 Argozelo
 Carção
 Matela
 Pinelo
 Santulhão
 Vale de Frades e Avelanoso
 Vilar Seco
 Vimioso

References

Towns in Portugal
Municipalities of Bragança District